William James Bischoff (1912–1988) was an Australian rugby league footballer who played in the 1930s and 1940s.

Playing career
Billy 'Bok' Bischoff was a five-eighth for Balmain between 1937 and 1940. He won a premiership with Balmain, playing in the winning 1939 Grand Final team. His son, Billy Bischoff Jr. also played for the Balmain Tigers in the 1960s.

Death
Bischoff died on 15 September 1988, aged 75.

References

1912 births
1988 deaths
Balmain Tigers players
Australian rugby league players
Country New South Wales rugby league team players
Rugby league five-eighths
Rugby league players from Sydney